Grevillea obtusiflora is a species of flowering plant in the family Proteaceae and is endemic to a small area of eastern New South Wales. It is a low, spreading to erect shrub with many stems, narrowly elliptic to oblong or linear to narrowly egg-shaped leaves with the narrower end towards the base, and pinkish-red and cream-coloured flowers with a red style.

Description
Grevillea obtusiflora is a spreading to erect shrub that typically grows to a height of  has many stems.

Taxonomy
Grevillea obtusiflora was first formally described in 1830 by Robert Brown in his Supplementum primum Prodromi florae Novae Hollandiae from specimens collected by Allan Cunningham in the Blue Mountains in 1822. The specific epithet (obtusiflora) means "blunt-flowered".

The names of two subspecies of G. obtusiflora have been accepted by the Australian Plant Census:
Flowering occurs from August to December. This subspecies is only known to reproduce from rhizomes and does not develop fruit.
Flowering occurs from July to October. This subspecies reproduces from rhizomes but does develop fruit.

Distribution and habitat

Conservation status
Both subspecies of G. obtusiflora are listed as "endangered" under the Australian Government Environment Protection and Biodiversity Conservation Act 1999 and the New South Wales Government Biodiversity Conservation Act 2016. The main threats to the subspecies include changes to natural fire regimes, roadside management activities, inappropriate land use and the small size of the populations of both subspecies. A recovery plan has been prepared.

References

obtusiflora
Flora of New South Wales
Proteales of Australia
Plants described in 1830
Taxa named by Robert Brown (botanist, born 1773)